Frida Scarpa (born 6 September 1976) is a former Italian fencer who won the World Championships with the national foil team in 2001, and two medals (a bronze individual in 1996 and silver with the team in 2003) at the European Championships.

Biography
Genoese by birth but Venetian by adoption, world champion in Nimes 2001 with the azzurro dream foil team: Valentina Vezzali, Giovanna Trillini and Diana Bianchedi (in that circumstance she replaced the injured Margherita Granbassi), after her sports career she got married with the teammate and Olympic champion with the team foil at Athens 2004  Salvatore Sanzo, the couple had two children, Virgina (born 2005) and Alessandro (born 2007). 

She embarked on a career as attorney in law and then, once separated from her husband, she continued to live in Pisa, city of Salvatore Sanzo and where her children lives. In her city of residence, Pisa, in 2021 she was the protagonist of the TV show of the Italian television Real Time , winning the episode's competition.

Achievements

References

External links
 
 Frida Scarpa at Italian Fencing Federation (FIS)
 Frida Scarpa at The Sports
 

1976 births
Living people
Italian female fencers
Italian foil fencers
Sportspeople from Genoa
Fencers of Gruppo Sportivo Forestale
20th-century Italian women